The Marquette Golden Eagles men's soccer program represents the Marquette University in all NCAA Division I men's college soccer competitions. Founded in 1964, the Golden Eagles compete in the Big East Conference. The Golden Eagles are coached by Louis Bennett. Marquette plays their home matches at Valley Fields.

Postseason tournament history

NCAA Tournament 
Marquette has appeared in three NCAA Tournaments. Their best performance came in 2013, when they reached the round of 16.

Honors 
Big East Conference Regular Season
 Winners (2): 2011, 2013
Big East Conference Men's Soccer Tournament
 Winners (1): 2013
Conference USA Regular Season
 Winners (2): 1997, 2002

References

External links 
 

 
1964 establishments in Wisconsin